Juliana Aleida Eileen van der Flier (born 24 February 1997) is an Irish former cricketer who played as a right-handed batter, right-arm medium bowler and occasional wicket-keeper. She appeared in one One Day International for Ireland in 2011, against Pakistan at the age of 14.

References

External links 
 
 

1997 births
Living people
Irish women cricketers
Ireland women One Day International cricketers
Cricketers from County Dublin
People educated at Wesley College, Dublin